Humppila is a municipality of Finland. It is located in the Tavastia Proper region.

The municipality owes the essence of its development to the arrival of the Turku–Toijala railway in 1876. Today, Humppila remains a stop for trains using this line and the once closed railway station has been reopened for passengers. From 1898 until 1974, Humppila was the starting point of the narrow gauge Jokioinen Railway, a  line to the town of Forssa. Today the remaining  of this line make the Jokioinen Museum Railway. There are two significant traffic highways through Humppila municipality: Highway 2 (between Vihti and Pori) and Highway 9 (between Turku and Tampere).

Neighbouring municipalities are Forssa, Jokioinen, Ypäjä, Loimaa, Punkalaidun, and Urjala. The municipality of Humppila is unilingually Finnish.

Villages
Vitikka, Huhtaa, Humppila, Koivisto, Murto, Taipale, Venäjä, and Myllynkulma

Economy

Major employers in Humppila are the Humppila municipality, Kenkämaailma (shoe retail), Humppilan Osuuspankki (banking), Iittala Group Humppila Glassworks, and Maviteknik Oy (engineering). Employment structure by trade at the end of 2004 was following: Agriculture and forestry economics 16.3%, industry 22.0%, services 58.5%, unknown 3.2%.

Transport
Humppila is served by Onnibus route Helsinki—Pori.

Notable individuals 
 Risto Jalo, ice hockey player
 Waldemar Bergroth, politician

References

External links

Municipality of Humppila – Official website

 
Municipalities of Kanta-Häme
1874 establishments in Finland